On 8 February 1993, Iran Air Tours Flight 962, a Tupolev Tu-154, collided in mid-air with an Islamic Republic of Iran Air Force (IRIAF) Sukhoi Su-24 attack aircraft near the Iranian capital of Tehran, killing all 133 people aboard both aircraft.  It is the deadliest aviation incident in 1993.

Aircraft

Iran Air Tours Flight 962 
Flight 962, with 119 passengers and 12 crew on board, departed from runway 29R at Tehran's Mehrabad Airport on a non-scheduled domestic flight to Mashhad International Airport in Mashhad. The aircraft was flown by an unnamed Russian captain who had 12,000 flight hours (the information on the remaining flight crew is unknown).

Sukhoi Su-24 
At the same time, five IRIAF Sukhoi Su-24 fighter jets were approaching Mehrabad's runway 29L using visual flight rules (VFR). They would later perform special maneuvers for the Iranian Revolution Commemoration Ceremony.

Collision 
Flight 962 was climbing at the direction of runway 29R, and at the same time the five Su-24s were descending to land on runway 29L. All five of them were separated one mile apart. One of the Su-24s, piloted by a crew of two pilots, turned left four miles west of the tower but did not have enough visibility as it was performing a go around. At this point, Flight 962 was nearing the Sukhoi fighter. Flight 962 and the Su-24 did not obtain visual sight of each other. At about 14:16 IRST, the two aircraft collided in mid-air; the rear engine and the tail of the Tupolev aircraft were torn off, and the flight crew lost control of the aircraft. All 131 people aboard the Iran Air Tours airliner and both military pilots died.

Investigation 
Investigators determined that the pilot of Flight 962 correctly followed ATC instructions. Iran's Civil Aviation Authority concluded that the causes of the collision were: errors made by the military pilots of the Sukhoi Su-24 and air traffic controller error. The primary causes were:

 The air traffic controller's decision allowed Flight 962 to climb while the Sukhoi Su-24s were descending.
 The controller failed to inform Flight 962 about the Sukhoi Su-24s entering their airspace.
 Failure to notify the military pilots about take-off of a Tupolev at the same time as the Sukhoi turns left.
 The controller did not express any concerns about the  distance between the two aircraft.
 The Sukhoi pilots failed to maintain the altitude as requested by the ATC, which caused the collision of the two aircraft.

See also 
 All Nippon Airways Flight 58
 Hughes Airwest Flight 706
 Libyan Arab Airlines Flight 1103
 List of Iranian aviation accidents and incidents
 Iran Airtour

References 

Aviation accidents and incidents in 1993
1993 in Iran
Aviation accidents and incidents in Iran
Accidents and incidents involving the Tupolev Tu-154
Mid-air collisions
Mid-air collisions involving airliners
Mid-air collisions involving military aircraft
Iran Air accidents and incidents
February 1993 events in Asia
Qods County